C. S. Sujatha (born 28 May 1965) is an Indian politician who was a member of the 14th Lok Sabha of India. She represented the Mavelikkara constituency of Kerala. She is a member of Communist Party of India (Marxist) (CPI(M)).

Political career
She became the District Panchayat President of Alappuzha in 1995 at the age of 29. She remained in the position until 2004. In 2004 Sujatha defeated Ramesh Chennithala of Indian National Congress (INC) by a margin of 7,414 votes in the Mavelikara constituency. Sujatha is the first CPI(M) candidate who has contested the elections in the party symbol to win from Mavelikara, which is considered to be a traditional UDF stronghold. She is also the first woman to represent Mavelikara in the Lok Sabha. She is now selected as Central Committee Member of CPI(M).

She was the CPI(M) candidate for the assembly election on 13 April 2011 at Chengannur constituency.

Positions held

2004: Elected to 14th Lok Sabha Member, Committee on Labour Member, Committee on Empowerment of women
2006-onwards Member, Committee on Empowerment of Women
2007 onwards Member, Standing Committee on Labour
1995-2004 President, District Panchayat, Alappuzha
1987-1990 Member (i) Senate, Kerala University
1988-1990 Syndicate, Kerala University
1998-2004 Central Committee, AIDWA
1990-1993 District Council

References

http://www.thehindu.com/2004/05/14/stories/2004051406580300.htm
http://164.100.47.194/Loksabha/Members/ArchiveMemberBioprofile.aspx?mpsno=4183&lastls=14

Communist Party of India (Marxist) politicians from Kerala
Living people
1965 births
Politicians from Alappuzha
India MPs 2004–2009
Lok Sabha members from Kerala
Members of the Kerala Legislative Assembly
21st-century Indian women politicians
21st-century Indian politicians
Women members of the Kerala Legislative Assembly